"Where Was I?" may refer to:

Books
"Where Was I?", essay by David Hawley Sanford from The Mind's I
Where Was I?, book by John Haycraft 2006
Where was I?!, book by Terry Wogan 2009

Film and TV
Where Was I? (film), 1925 film directed by William A. Seiter. With Reginald Denny, Marian Nixon, Pauline Garon, Lee Moran.
Where Was I? (2001 film), biography about songwriter Tim Rose
Where Was I? (TV series) 1952–1953 Quiz show with the panelists attempting to guess a location by looking at photos  
"Where Was I?" episode of Shoestring (TV series) 1980

Music
"Where was I", song by W. Franke Harling and Al Dubin performed by Ruby Newman and His Orchestra  with vocal chorus by  Larry Taylor and Peggy McCall  1939
"Where Was I", single from Charley Pride discography 1988
"Where Was I" (song), a 1994 song by Ricky Van Shelton
"Where Was I (Donde Estuve Yo)", song by Joe Pass from Simplicity (Joe Pass album)
"Where Was I?", song by Guttermouth from The Album Formerly Known as a Full Length LP (Guttermouth album)
"Where Was I", song by Sawyer Brown (Billy Maddox, Paul Thorn, Anne Graham) from Can You Hear Me Now 2002 
"Where Was I?", song  by  Kenny Wayne Shepherd from Live On  1999
"Where Was I", song by Melanie Laine (Victoria Banks, Steve Fox) from Time Flies (Melanie Laine album)
"Where Was I", song by Rosie Thomas from With Love (Rosie Thomas album)